Dyscoliidae is a family of brachiopods belonging to the order Terebratulida.

Genera

Genera:
 Abyssothyris Thomson, 1927
 †Acrobelesia Cooper, 1983
 Ceramisia Cooper, 1983

References

Brachiopods